Moerarchis placomorpha is a species of moth of the family Tineidae. It is found in Australia (including Queensland).

References

Moths described in 1922
Myrmecozelinae
Moths of Australia